Pili, officially the Municipality of Pili (Rinconada Bikol: Banwaan ka Pili) is a 1st class municipality and capital of the province of Camarines Sur, Philippines. According to the 2020 census, it has a population of 99,196 people.

History

The first recorded history of Pili started during the promulgation of Christianity in the early 1770s by the Spanish missionaries, when the town houses the “Cimarrones” or the “Remontados” who resisted the foreign rule of the neighboring Hispanic city of Nueva Caceres. The early center of settlement in the town was located in "Binanuaanan" (from "banwaan" which means town in the Bikol language) until missionaries transferred it to the present site of the town proper where the St. Raphael Archangel Church is located.

The Americans established the town of Pili in 1901. The name of the town has many disputed etymologies, either it came from the Bicol Region's Pili nut (Canarium ovatum) or from the Bicol word “pili” or “to choose”. The latter is because the Americans wanted to make the town as the new provincial urban center due to the fact that Naga City which the Spaniards had developed was prone to major floods. The town is also a very strategic location for the Americans. Pili connects the major districts of the province: the Bikol Naga-speaking towns of the North, Partido Area, and the Rinconada Area. It was here where they build the current Naga Airport and the Camarines Sur Agricultural School in 1918 which is now the main campus of the Central Bicol State University of Agriculture. The town of Pili was formally established in 1919 as a municipality.

When World War II broke out in 1941 the Japanese Imperial Army sent 3,000 soldiers to Pili due to the concentration of American developments in the town. They built tunnels, manmade caves, and foxholes all over the town which are still existent in the town today. The infrastructures of the war were mostly in the barangays of Cadlan, Curry, San Jose and even in the Centro area. When the Japanese started to lose, they flee to Mt. Isarog to hide. They created a lot of holes in Mt. Isarog and used the mountain as their last stand in the Bicol Region. In the present, the heroes of the war were remembered through Filipino-Japanese Friendship Historical Landmark in Sitio Bongcao, Curry at the foot of Mt. Isarog.

When Naga City was declared as a chartered city, there is a need to search for the next provincial capital. Former Governor Juan F. Trivino chooses the municipality of Pili as its capital. Finally on June 6, 1955, Pili was declared as the provincial capital by virtue of R.A. 1336, replacing Naga City. The new site for the provincial capitol was the 150 hectare lot donation of Don Susano Rodriguez in the barangay of Cadlan.

Geography

Barangays
Pili is politically subdivided into 26 barangays.

Climate

Demographics

While the Centro district, which consists of six barangays, has a total population of 12,104 according to the 2015 Census.

Languages
There are two dialects of the Bikolano language which is used all over the municipality. The Naga variant of Central Bikolano on the northern part, and Riŋkonāda or Rinconada Bikol on the south. However, the Naga variant of Central Bikolano is the lingua franca which is used all throughout for communication. Tagalog and English language are also widely understood.

Religion
Roman Catholicism is the predominant religion in the municipality, where the town is under the jurisdiction of the Archdiocese of Caceres in Naga City. Known churches in the town includes St. Raphael the Archangel Parish in Poblacion district and Our Lady of Remedies Parish Church in the uptown Barangay Curry. It is followed by Born-Again Christian denominations, Iglesia ni Cristo, Jehovah's Witnesses, etc.

Culture

Aside from the feast of every barangay and sitios, there are two major festivals being celebrated in the town. The municipal government hosts the religious-based town fiesta in the Centro district, while the provincial government has its own festival for its foundation.

The Pili Town Fiesta is for the celebration of the feast of St. Raphael the Archangel, the patron saint of Pili. It is celebrated annually every October 23–24 since the foundation of the parish in 1819. The Cimarrones Festival is an annual cultural festival held on the whole month of October in Pili. It is celebrated by the six barangays of the Pili Centro District. The festival has three popular major events in the capital town: Street Dancing Competition, Musical Night, and Miss Capital Town.

Economy

Due to the increase of economic activities in the town, Pili is now classified as a 1st class municipality in terms of income classification.  Attaining a steady progress through time, the capital town is now preparing to be the next chartered city in the province of Camarines Sur. This is through the Executive Order No. 24, Series of 2020 on June 1, 2020, which created the "Pili Cityhood Committee" headed by Mayor Tom P. Bongalonta Jr. The committee is tasked to evaluate, study, prepare, and propose the necessary requirements of the law to convert Pili into a chartered city by Later this year. When Pili becomes an official city, it will be called “The City of Chosen” and “The Rising Central Capital”. The nickname was based on the place name “Pili” and the place where the beautiful sunrise meets Mt. Isarog. It is also based on Pili's economy where it is growing rapidly.

The town of Pili is the Bicolandia's Agro-Industrial Center, with its reputation as the Bicol region's burgeoning industrial town due to its giant warehouses and milling plants. Urbanization is very rapid in the town with its high population growth due to its continuous progress and development.

The municipality has been the third largest commercial center in Camarines Sur and the 10th largest commercial center in the Bicol Region. The commercial and business center is the town proper, which the locals called "Pili Centro", and is the densest part of the town. The "Daang Maharlika" or the national road is the main road of the town proper, where it stretches from San Isidro to Santiago. Markets in the district includes the Pili Public Market, SM Savemore Market, and the LCC Supermarket. Multiple department stores also made their way to the town.

The barangays of Cadlan and San Jose, located at the northern part of the town, are the center of developments and activities of the provincial government of Camarines Sur. It also has a high concentration of provincial government institutions in the province of Camarines Sur, aside from the provincial government offices in Naga City. Barangay San Jose is the location of Camarines Sur Freedom Sports Complex which hosts provincial and regional sports events.

Agricultural and agro-industrial developments

The town of Pili has a “plain and elevated” geography, thus is very ideal for agriculture. Majority of the farmlands are in the area between the Uptown and Downtown Area. Rice, sugarcanes, and corn are the primary products.

Aside from being Bicolandia's Agro-Industrial Center, Pili is also the regional center of agricultural administration in the Bicol Region. At the barangay of San Agustin, the Department of Agriculture - Regional Office, the Central Bicol Experiment Station, and the Agricultural Training Institute are located.

 Old agro-industrial zone

The old agro-industrial zone of the town is concentrated at the southwest portion of the town, and stretches along the Pili Diversion Road and south of the poblacion district (New San Roque, Anayan, etc.).

The Co Say and Company Inc. was the pioneer in the agro-industrial development of the town. It has an Oil Milling Plant which produces crude coconut oil at La Purisima near the Pili Diversion Road, and its former Rice Milling Plant at Tagbong. Now, the area also hosts the Partido Rice Mill, Bicol Biomass Energy Corporation (the first rice husk-fired power plant in Southern Luzon), B-Meg Plant - Southern Luzon Feedmill Inc. (SLFI), Penafrancia Sugar Mill (Pensumil), and giant warehouses of WL Foods Corporation, etc.

 Santa Rita Industrial Park

The Santa Rita Industrial Park, developed by the Santa Rita Ecozone Corporation, is located in Barangay San Jose and Sagurong. It has a land area of 219 hectares. Notable landmarks in the economic zone includes the Bicol JL Agri Corporation and the Pili Water District.

 Isarog Heights Special Economic Zone

It is a planned new economic zone in the town. It will be developed by the Manubay Agro-Industrial and Development Corporation with an estimated project cost of 799.26 million pesos. It has a land area of 124.3 hectares in the barangay of Cadlan, which has preferred industries in food processing and manufacturing.

Car sale, restaurants and service centers 
Pili is now known for its giant warehouses and sale stores for cars and home furniture stretching along the Maharlika Highway in the barangay of San Jose, Cadlan, and Palestina. The developments are rapidly increasing since 2013.

San Jose houses the imposing car sales and service centers of Honda and Nissan, both conceded to be among the biggest in South Luzon. Foton, a China-based automaker, also open their own service center with Subaru Motors which is a near high-end car manufacturer. Home furniture sellers include the Uratex Foam, Union Galvasteel – Bicol Roll Forming Plant, FC Tile Center, and My Home Depot. The San Agustin belt area also hosts NXTGEN McDonald's, Biggs and Shakey's Pizza. The barangay of Cadlan hosts the Toyota Camarines Sur, while Palestina hosts Mitsubishi and Isuzu.

Housing developments 
Just a neighboring town of Naga City, it is now the host of many housing developments ranging from middle to high class ones. Barangay Palestina is ideal for housing developments because it is the nearest barangay to the city. The advantage of Pili from the other neighboring towns of Naga City is its infrastructure developments like the Naga Airport and top tourist destinations like the Camarines Sur Watersports Complex. Housing developments in Palestina includes the Amaia Scapes, Lumina Homes, St. Paul Subdivision, Pamon Village, etc. In the barangay of Cadlan, there is the Camella Homes and Lessandra Pili.

Eco-tourism 

At the foot of the mountain, the highland area of Mt. Isarog includes the barangays of Tinangis, Curry, and Santo Nino. Landmarks in this area includes the Filipino-Japanese Friendship Monument declared as a National Historical Landmark in Sitio Boncao, Barangay Curry, White Cross at the entrance of Tinangis, and the Jose Velarde Race Track (Curry). The Mt. Isarog National Park is not only known for its biodiversity and beauty; it is also famous for its clean and cold flowing water. The natural waterfalls in Pili includes Tinagrawan Falls at Tinangis and the “Eight Waterfalls in One River of Sitio Boncao, Curry” which includes the Slide Falls and the Balang (Shower) Falls.

One natural waterfall which is visible from the downtown especially during rainy weather is the Maati Falls. It came from the Bicol word "ati" or "loses a certain amount for a fluid", because the falls was perceived to vanish during a sunny weather and appear again during a rainy weather. However, it was believed that reaching the Maati Falls is very difficult.

Mt. Isarog now serves as the source of drinking water throughout the town of Pili via the Pili Water District.

Government

Like other municipalities in the Philippines, Pili is governed by a municipal mayor and vice mayor who are elected to three-year terms. The mayor is the executive head and leads the municipal departments in executing the municipal ordinances and improving public services. The municipal mayor is restricted to three consecutive terms, totaling nine years, although a mayor can be elected again after an interruption of one term. The vice mayor heads a legislative council consisting of 10 members: 8 councilors, the president of the Sangguniang Kabataan (Youth Council) Federation, representing the youth sector, and the president of the Association of Barangay Chairmen (ABC) as barangay sectoral representative. The council is in charge of creating the lgu's policies in the form of Ordinances and Resolutions.

Municipal officials
The current mayor of Pili is Hon. Tomas P. Bongalonta, Jr.

Infrastructure

Transportation

Pili is the site of Naga Airport. It serves the City of Naga and the rest of Metro Naga (which includes the capital town of Pili, Camarines Sur). It is located inside the main campus of Central Bicol State University of Agriculture at the barangay of San Jose.

The town is not coastal and thus depends mainly on land transportation. Major local transportation are either on jeepneys or buses. Some barangays also use motorcycles (habal-habal). The Philippine National Railways have a night train service from Manila called Mayon Limited. It arrives at Pili railway station at 5:58/5:59am local time.

Utilities
Water supplied by the established water system under the Pili Water District (PIWAD), which has a water source from Mt. Isarog.  Power and electricity is supplied by the Camarines Sur Electric Cooperative II (CASURECO II).

Education 

There are two major “school belts” in the town: the San Jose (in the North) and the Pili Centro (in the South). The barangay of San Jose, which is considered as the provincial education hub, has the highest density in terms of number of learning institutions among the barangays in the town which is comparable to the whole of Centro district.

The “San Jose Belt” stretches along the Maharlika Highway from San Jose North Elementary School (Camarines Sur Freedom Sports Complex) to San Jose South Elementary School. While, the “Pili Centro Belt” stretches also along the Maharlika Highway from the Universidad de Santa Isabel – Pili Campus up to Pili National High School.

The Central Bicol State University of Agriculture (CBSUA), a state university, has its main campus located in the town specifically in San Jose. Its other campuses can be found in the towns of Pasacao, Sipocot, and Calabanga, which are all in the province of Camarines Sur. The university also houses the Computer Science High School of Bicolandia in its main campus which is now DepEd-administered.

The CBSUA is now SUC level IV and ISO 9001:2015 accredited. It celebrated its centennial year in 2018. The university continues to be a Center of Development first in Agricultural and then Education and Teaching Education in the country and is known as one of the National University/College of Agriculture (NUCA) in the Philippines.

References

External links

 [ Philippine Standard Geographic Code]
Philippine Census Information
Official Site of the Province of Camarines Sur

Municipalities of Camarines Sur
Provincial capitals of the Philippines